Ooni Ogun was the 3rd Ooni of Ife, a paramount traditional ruler of Ile Ife, the ancestral home of the Yorubas. He succeeded his father Ooni Osangangan Obamakin and was succeeded by Obalufon Ogbogbodirin.

References

Oonis of Ife
Yoruba history